First Christian Church of Burlington is a historic church located at 415 S. Church Street in Burlington, Alamance County, North Carolina. The church was built in 1920, and is a Neoclassical Revival style church building with an Akron Plan interior. The building features two main temple facades and a dome. A three-story educational building was constructed in 1953.

It was added to the National Register of Historic Places in 1984.

References

Churches in Burlington, North Carolina
Churches on the National Register of Historic Places in North Carolina
Neoclassical architecture in North Carolina
Churches completed in 1920
National Register of Historic Places in Alamance County, North Carolina
Neoclassical church buildings in the United States